Miss Seychelles Universe or Miss Universe Seychelles is a national Beauty pageant in Seychelles where the winner is sent to Miss Universe. The current Miss Seychelles Universe 2022 is Gabriella Gonthier of Mahé.

History
Began 1995 an agency, Telly’s Modelling Agency in Seychelles took over the license of Miss Universe pageant. The 1st edition of Miss Kreol 1994 winner sent to Miss Universe 1995 in Namibia. After so many years Seychelles absent at Miss Universe, in 2022 Tery Carola (President of Miss Seychelles Universe) successfully took Miss Universe license back for Seychelles.

Miss Universe license holder in Seychelles
 Miss Kreol, Telly’s Modelling Agency (1994—1995)
 Tery Carola (2022—present)

Titleholders

Titleholders under Miss Universe Seychelles org.

Miss Universe Seychelles

Miss Seychelles has started to send the winner to Miss Universe in 1995. On occasion, when the winner does not qualify (due to age) for either contest, a runner-up is sent.

References

Beauty pageants in Seychelles
Entertainment events in Seychelles
Recurring events established in 1994
1994 establishments in Seychelles
Seychelles
Seychelles